Babubhai Patel, known by his alias Babu Bajrangi, is a leader of the Gujarat-wing of the Bajrang Dal, a Hindu right wing organization in India. He was a central figure during the 2002 Gujarat violence. He was sentenced to life term imprisonment by a special court for his role in masterminding the Naroda Patiya massacre in which 97  Muslims were murdered including 36 women, 26 men and 35 children. The Supreme Court of India granted him bail on medical grounds in March 2019.

Role in 2002 riots 
In 2007, the Indian journal Tehelka published a hidden-camera interview with Bajrangi, in which Bajrangi speaks candidly of his role in the violence against Indian Muslims in the Naroda Patiya massacre, a particularly intense episode of brutality during the 2002 Gujarat riots:

In the video, Bajrangi claimed that after the killings, he called the home minister Gordhan Zadaphia and the VHP General Secretary Jaideep Patel, and told them about the killings. After a few hours, an FIR was lodged against him, and the police commissioner issued orders to shoot him at sight. He was later arrested, and released on bail. He was out on bail at the time of the Tehelka interview. He also claimed Narendra Modi changed judges three times to ensure that he was released from jail, as the first two judges wanted to sentence Bajrangi to hanging for his heinous crimes.

In 2012, he was convicted in the Naroda Patiya massacre case along with Maya Kodnani and thirty other accused. All thirty-two of the accused were found guilty of "murder, attempt to murder, conspiracy, spreading enmity and communal hatred and unlawful assembly".

On 31 August 2012, Bajrangi was sentenced to life imprisonment. However, he continues to be out of jail on bail. As of 2016, Bajrangi had been granted temporary bail 14 times on the pretext of his wife's and his own poor health. After claiming to have developed partial blindness and deafness, Bajrangi was given an attendant (bodyguard) in Sabarmati Central Jail. On 7 March 2019, the Supreme Court of India also granted bail to Babu Bajrangi, after the Gujarat government informed the Supreme Court, in reply to a bail plea that Bajrangi had filed last year, that he was “in bad shape”. The state told the court that Bajrangi has allegedly suffered complete vision loss, besides various other ailments.

Other activities
Babu Bajrangi also runs a trust called Navchetan trust, which as per his claims saves the girls who run out of their home and marry outside their community. In a report of the Frontline magazine it was claimed that his organisation use intimidation and violence to forcibly end the marriages done outside the community. As per this reports and his claims he had "saved" more than 700 girls from such inter caste marriages.

References

Living people
Gujarat politicians
2002 Gujarat riots
Hindutva
Bajrang Dal members
Year of birth missing (living people)
Indian prisoners sentenced to life imprisonment
Indian people convicted of murder
Hindu nationalists
Hinduism-motivated violence in India